Pizzle is a Middle English word for penis, derived from Low German  or Flemish Dutch , diminutive of , meaning 'sinew'. The word is used today to signify the penis of an animal, chiefly in Australia and New Zealand.

Original uses

The word pizzle is also known, at least since 1523, especially in the combination "bull pizzle", to denote a flogging instrument made from a bull's penis. It derives from the Low German  or Flemish , originally from the Dutch language  meaning "sinew".

In William Shakespeare's play Henry IV, Part 1, the character Falstaff uses the term as an insult (Act 2, Scene IV):
'Sblood, you starveling, you elf-skin, you dried neat's tongue, you bull's pizzle, you stock-fish!

In heraldry

In 1485, Henry VII carried with him a red dragon on the field of Bosworth where he was declared King of England. The dragon was depicted with an erect pizzle, and although the pizzle is missing in many variations of the Welsh flag, the British royal family continue to depict the pizzle.

The bear in the coat of arms of Appenzell is represented pizzled, and omission of this feature was seen as a grave insult. In 1579, the pizzle was forgotten by the printer of a calendar printed in Saint Gallen, which brought Appenzell to the brink of war with Saint Gallen.

In 2007, commander Karl Engelbrektson decided that the lion's penis in the coat of arms of the Nordic Battlegroup had to be removed. Contrary to initial media reports that the decision was taken following complaints from female soldiers, Engelbrektsson revealed in a February 2008 interview with Sveriges Radio that it was he who made the decision, based on the 2000 United Nations Security Council Resolution 1325 on women, peace, and security. Since civilian women are often sexually assaulted in the war zones of the world, the commander did not consider the depiction of a penis appropriate on a uniform worn into battle. The decision was questioned by some Swedish heraldists, with Vladimir Sagerlund asserting that coats of arms containing lions without a penis were historically given to those who had betrayed the Swedish Crown. The state heraldist Henrik Klackenberg complained that his heraldry unit should have been consulted before making such change, but did not intend to take legal action.

Modern uses

Paramilitary use in World War II
Pizzles were widely used (as whips) as late as 1944 by local paramilitary units on the Eastern Front, usually as a disciplinary measure against arrested or bullied civilians.

Animal consumption
Pizzles, or bully sticks, are mostly produced today as chewing treats for dogs.

Bull penises are dried, in open air or in ovens. Commercial vendors will drain  the blood and urine from the organ prior to drying in order to decrease the smell of these when chewed by dogs. These are called "odor free" bully sticks. "Junior" bully sticks are thinner ones that are made from castrated male (steer).

Glue
The pizzle of bull was commonly rendered for use as glue.

Human consumption

In addition to being used as a dog treat, pizzles are also eaten by humans for their purported health benefits (according to traditional Chinese medicine) such as being low in cholesterol and high in protein, hormones, and vitamins, and minerals such as calcium and magnesium, although little empirical evidence supports these claims. Pizzles for human consumption are prepared either by freezing or by drying.

Scottish deer pizzles are thought to boost stamina and were used by Chinese athletes at the 2008 Summer Olympics. Pizzles can be served in soup, and if they have been dried they can be turned into a paste. Pizzles may also be mixed with alcoholic beverages or simply thawed (if frozen) and eaten. In Jamaica, bull pizzles are referred to as "cow cods" and are eaten as cow cod soup. Like many animal penis or testicle based foods, cow cod soup is claimed to be an aphrodisiac and to be able to boost muscle strength.

References

Offal
Penis
id:Penis#Morfologi